Elections in Chhattisgarh are being conducted since the formation of the state in 2000, to elect the members of Chhattisgarh Vidhan Sabha and the members of the Lok Sabha. There are 90 Vidhan Sabha constituencies and 11 Lok Sabha constituencies in the state.

Major Political Parties in Chhattisgarh 
The BJP and INC have been the most dominant parties in the state since its formation. Other political parties are BSP & JCC.

Lok Sabha elections 
It is worth noting that till the year 2000, Chhattisgarh was a part of undivided Madhya Pradesh state.

Total Seats- 11

Vidhan Sabha elections
Total Seats- 90

 The First assembly of Chhattisgarh was constituted on the basis of the Madhya Pradesh state legislative assembly elections held in 1998.

References